The 1994 CONCACAF Women's Championship was the third staging of the CONCACAF's Women's Championship. It determined the CONCACAF's two qualifiers for the FIFA Women's World Cup 1995 — the winner the United States and the runner-up Canada. The tournament took place in Montreal, Quebec, Canada between August 13 and 21, 1994, and consisted of five teams.

Venues

Final round

Awards

External links
Tables & results at RSSSF.com
USWNT Results 1990-1994 at ussoccerhistory.org

Women's Championship
CONCACAF Women's Championship tournaments
1995 FIFA Women's World Cup qualification
International women's association football competitions hosted by Canada
1994 in American women's soccer
CON
1994 in Canadian soccer
1994–95 in Mexican football
August 1994 sports events in Canada
1994 in Canadian women's sports